The Haumea or Haumean family is the only identified trans-Neptunian collisional family; that is, the only group of trans-Neptunian objects (TNOs) with similar orbital parameters and spectra (nearly pure water-ice) that suggest they originated in the disruptive impact of a progenitor body. Calculations indicate that it is probably the only trans-Neptunian collisional family.
Members are known as Haumeids.

Members

Characteristics

The brightest Haumeids have absolute magnitudes (H) bright enough to suggest a size between 400 and 700 km in diameter, and so possible dwarf planets, if they had the albedos of typical TNOs; however, they are likely to be much smaller as it is thought they are water-icy bodies with high albedos. The dispersion of the proper orbital elements of the members is a few percent or less (5% for semi-major axis, 1.4°  for the inclination and 0.08 for the eccentricity). The diagram illustrates the orbital elements of the members of the family in relation to other TNOs.

The objects' common physical characteristics include neutral colours and deep infrared absorption features (at 1.5 and 2.0 μm) typical of water ice.

Member orbits

Resonances with Neptune
The current orbits of the members of the family cannot be accounted for by the formational collision alone. To explain the spread of the orbital elements, an initial velocity dispersion of ≈ 400 m/s is required, but such a velocity spread should have dispersed the fragments much further. This problem applies only to Haumea itself; the orbital elements of all the other objects in the family require an initial velocity dispersion of just ≈ 140 m/s. To explain this mismatch in the required velocity dispersion, Brown and colleagues suggest that Haumea initially had orbital elements closer to those of the other members of the family and its orbit (especially the orbital eccentricity) changed after the collision. Unlike the other members of the family, Haumea is in an intermittent 7:12 resonance with Neptune, which could have increased Haumea's eccentricity to its current value.

The Haumea family occupies a region of the Kuiper belt where multiple resonances (including the 3:5, 4:7, 7:12, 10:17 and 11:19 mean motion resonances) interact, leading to the orbital diffusion of that collision family. Beside the intermittent 7:12 resonance currently occupied by Haumea itself, other members of the family occupy some of the other resonances, and resonance hopping (switching from one resonance to another) is possible on a time scale of hundreds of millions of years. , the first member of the Haumea family to be discovered, is currently in an intermittent 11:19 resonance.

Formation and evolution
Collisional formation of the family requires a progenitor some 1660 km in diameter, with a density of ~2.0 g/cm3, similar to Pluto and Eris. During the formational collision, Haumea lost roughly 20% of its mass, mostly ice, and became denser.

In addition to the effects of resonances with Neptune, there may be other complications in the origin of the family. It has been suggested that the material ejected in the initial collision may have coalesced into a large moon of Haumea, which gradually increased its distance from Haumea through tidal evolution, and was then later shattered in a second collision, dispersing its shards outwards. This second scenario produces a velocity dispersion of ~190 m/s, considerably closer to the measured ~140 m/s velocity dispersion of the family members; it also avoids the difficulty of the observed ~140 m/s dispersion being much less than the ~900 m/s escape velocity of Haumea.

Haumea may not be the only elongated, rapidly rotating, large object in the Kuiper belt.  In 2002, Jewitt and Sheppard suggested that  should be elongated, based on its rapid rotation. In the early history of the Solar System, the trans-Neptunian region would have contained many more objects than it does at present, increasing the likelihood of collisions between objects. Gravitational interaction with Neptune has since scattered many objects out of the Kuiper belt to the scattered disc.

The presence of the collisional family hints that Haumea and its "offspring" might have originated in the scattered disc. In today's sparsely populated Kuiper belt, the chance of such a collision occurring over the age of the Solar System is less than 0.1 percent. The family could not have formed in the denser primordial Kuiper belt because such a close-knit group would have been disrupted by Neptune's subsequent migration into the belt, which is thought to have been the cause of its current low density. Therefore, it appears likely that the dynamic scattered disc region, in which the possibility of such a collision is far higher, is the place of origin for the object which would become Haumea and its kin. Simulations suggest the probability of one such family in the Solar System is approximately 50%, so it is possible that the Haumea family is unique.

Because it would have taken at least a billion years for the group to have diffused as far as it has, the collision that created the Haumea family is thought to have occurred very early in the Solar System's history. This conflicts with the findings of Rabinowitz and colleagues who found in their studies of the group that their surfaces were remarkably bright; their colour suggests that they have recently (i.e. within the last 100 million years) been resurfaced by fresh ice. Over a timescale as long as a billion years, energy from the Sun would have reddened and darkened their surfaces, and no plausible explanation has been found to account for their apparent youth.

However, more detailed studies of the visible and near infrared spectrum of Haumea show it is a homogeneous surface covered by an intimate 1:1 mixture of amorphous and crystalline ice, together with no more than 8% organics. This high amount of amorphous ice on the surface confirms that the collisional event must have happened more than 100 million years ago. This result agrees with the dynamical studies and discards the assumption that the surfaces of these objects are young.

See also
Asteroid family
Haumea
Moons of Haumea

References

External links
http://news.softpedia.com/news/New-Body-Parts-From-Kuiper-Belt-039-s-Haumea-95833.shtml

 
Distant minor planet groups and families